Jonathan Delaplace (born 20 March 1986) is a French footballer who plays as a midfielder.

References

External links

1986 births
Living people
People from La Seyne-sur-Mer
Association football midfielders
French footballers
S.V. Zulte Waregem players
ÉFC Fréjus Saint-Raphaël players
Lille OSC players
Stade Malherbe Caen players
FC Lorient players
Belgian Pro League players
Ligue 1 players
Ligue 2 players
French expatriate footballers
Expatriate footballers in Belgium
Sportspeople from Var (department)
Footballers from Provence-Alpes-Côte d'Azur